Shadows of the Night is a 1928 American silent drama film directed by D. Ross Lederman and written by Robert E. Hopkins and D. Ross Lederman. The film stars Flash the Dog, Lawrence Gray, Louise Lorraine, Warner Richmond, and Tom Dugan. It was released on October 26, 1928, by Metro-Goldwyn-Mayer.

A copy of Shadows of the Night is housed at the Cinémathèque Française in Paris, France.

Cast
Flash the Dog as Flash
Lawrence Gray as Jimmy Sherwood
Louise Lorraine as Molly
Warner Richmond as Feagan
Tom Dugan as Connelly
Alphonse Ethier as O'Flaherty
Polly Moran as Entertainer
Drew Demorest
Joyzelle Joyner as Cabaret Dancer
Robert Perry
Eddie Sturgis

References

External links

1928 films
1920s English-language films
Silent American drama films
1928 drama films
Metro-Goldwyn-Mayer films
Films directed by D. Ross Lederman
American black-and-white films
American silent feature films
1920s American films